Zeyad Errafae'ie (born May 12, 1967 – died August 26, 2009) was a Syrian television actor and voice actor.

Early life
Three years studied sociology and then won the certificate literal electronics, he was his first work with the Venus Center series North Wind in 1994. He works with Venus Center in 1994.

Filmography

Dubbing roles 
Captain Tsubasa – Ken Wakashimazu (seasons 3, 4 and 5), Shutetsu coach (season 3 only), Yuzo Morisaki (season 3 only), Mamoru Izawa (child season 3 only), Ryo Ishizaki (adult season 3 only)
Aesop World
Animaniacs - Wakko Warner
Ginga Sengoku Gun'yūden Rai
Mobile Suit Gundam Wing
Hunter × Hunter – Leorio
Baby & Me
The Scooby-Doo Show - Fred Jones
Dragon Quest: Dai no Daibōken
Pinky and the Brain – Pinky
Remi, Nobody's Girl
Black Cat
Naruto
Detective Conan
One Piece – Luffy (episodes 1–71), Zeff (episodes 20–23)
Dragon Ball Z – Gogo (Goku) (episodes 1–53), Zarbon (episodes 44–53)

Death 
He died on the morning of Friday, August 26, 2009, corresponding to 5 Ramadan 1430 after suffering a car accident on its impact remained in the hospital until he died at the age of 42.

References

1969 births
2009 deaths
Road incident deaths in Syria
Syrian male television actors
Syrian male voice actors
Syrian voice directors